Stonebridge or StoneBridge may refer to:

Places 
 Stonebridge Estate (disambiguation)

United Kingdom
 Stonebridge, Essex, a hamlet
 Stonebridge, London, an area in northwest London
 Stonebridge, Norfolk, a village
 Stonebridge, West Midlands, a junction between the A45 and A452 roads in England
 Stonebridge, part of the parish of Kilmore, County Armagh, Northern Ireland
 Stonebridge City Farm, a City Farm in St Ann's, Nottingham, United Kingdom
 Stonebridge Green, a settlement adjacent to, and within the civil parish of, Egerton in the Ashford District of Kent, England
 Stonebridge Lock, a paired lock on the River Lee Navigation in the London Borough of Haringey
 Stonebridge Park (disambiguation)
 Stonebridge Road, a multi-purpose stadium in Kent, United Kingdom, primarily used for football

Canada
 Stonebridge, Ottawa, a golf course community in Ontario
 Stonebridge, Saskatoon, a neighbourhood in Saskatchewan
 Saskatoon Stonebridge-Dakota, a provincial electoral district for the Legislative Assembly of Saskatchewan

New Zealand
 Stonebridge, New Zealand (AKA Stonebridge Estate), an upper-class suburb in Hamilton

United States
 Stonebridge, New Jersey, a census-designated place
 Stonebridge, Texas, a census-designated place
 Stonebridge Golf Club, a golf complex in Rome, Georgia
 Stonebridge at Potomac Town Center, a lifestyle center in Woodbridge, Virginia

People
 Brian Stonebridge (192859), English motorcycle racer
 Ian Stonebridge (born 1981), English footballer
 StoneBridge (DJ) (AKA Sten Hallström), Swedish DJ and record producer

Other uses
 Stonebridge Elementary, a public elementary school in Stillwater, Minnesota, United States
 Stonebridge International Insurance Ltd, founded 1998 in Maidenhead, Berkshire, United Kingdom
 Stonebridge Press, a newspaper company in Massachusetts, United States
 Stonebridge Railway, a dismantled railway in Warwickshire, United Kingdom

See also 
 Albright Stonebridge Group, a global strategy and business advisory firm based in Washington, D.C.
 Stone Bridge (disambiguation)
 Bridgestone